"Whenever You're Ready" is the name of a 1987 hit single by British pop group Five Star, the first release from their third album, Between the Lines. The single peaked at #11 in the UK.

Track listings
7” Single and 7" gatefold pack:

"Whenever You're Ready"
"Forever Yours" [Deniece Pearson]

12” Single and cassette single:
"Whenever You're Ready" (The New York Mix) 6:33
"Whenever You're Ready" (Crazy Dub Jammy)
"Are You Man Enough?" (Shep Pettibone Remix) - early fade of (US 12" Vocal Remix)
"Forever Yours"

All tracks available on the remastered versions of either the 2012 'Between The Lines' album, the 2013 'The Remix Anthology (The Remixes 1984-1991)' or the 2018 'Luxury - The Definitive Anthology 1984-1991' boxset.

Charts

References

Five Star songs
1987 singles
1987 songs
RCA Records singles
Songs written by Lionel Job